Leonardo Costagliola (27 October 1921 – 7 March 2008) was an Italian football player and manager who played as a goalkeeper. Throughout his career, he played for several Italian clubs and represented the Italy national football team at the 1954 FIFA World Cup.

Club career
Born in Taranto, throughout his career (1938–1963) Costagliola played a total of 623 matches, playing for Italian clubs Pro Italia Taranto (1938–1940), A.S. Bari (1940–1943; 1945–1948), U.S. Conversano (1943–1944), and AC Fiorentina (1948–1955). He made his Serie A debut with Bari, on 27 October 1940, in a 4–2 away win over Triestina.

International career
Regarded as one of the best and most consistent Italian shot-stoppers of his generation, with the Italian national team, Costagliola played 3 games between 1953 and 1954 and participated at the 1954 FIFA World Cup, although he did not feature in the competition. He made his Italy senior debut in a 2–1 away win over Egypt, on 13 November 1953, in a World Cup qualifier.

After retirement
After retiring, Costagliola started a career as a trainer, managing several Italian clubs.

References

External links

Profile at Enciclopediadelcalcio.it 
Profile at FIGC.it 

1921 births
2008 deaths
Italian footballers
Italy international footballers
Association football goalkeepers
S.S.C. Bari players
Taranto F.C. 1927 players
ACF Fiorentina players
1954 FIFA World Cup players
Sportspeople from Taranto
Serie A players